David Josué Colmán Escobar (born 25 July 1998) is a Paraguayan professional footballer who plays as a midfielder for Liga MX club Mazatlán.

Club career
Colmán helped Cerro Porteño win the 2017 Torneo Clausura championship.

In January 2018, Colmán signed with Orlando City and was given a Young Designated Player tag. Colmán made his Orlando City debut on 17 March 2018 against New York City FC. He scored his first goal for the club on 31 March 2018 against New York Red Bulls. Colmán was left out of Orlando City's lineup for a 6 May 2018 match after he had broken a team rule in the locker room.

In June 2019, Colmán returned to Cerro Porteño on a one and a half year loan deal.. On 26 September 2020, Cerro Porteño clinched the Apertura title with one match to spare following a 3–1 victory over River Plate.

Colmán had his contract option declined as part of Orlando's end of season roster moves in December 2020.

On 28 January 2021, Colmán signed with Paraguayan Primera División side Guaraní.

International career
He played for the Paraguay under-17 team at the 2015 FIFA U-17 World Cup and the Paraguay under-20s at the 2017 South American U-20 Championship.

Personal life
In February 2019, Colmán obtained a U.S. green card, which qualified him as a domestic player for MLS roster purposes.

Career statistics

Club

Honours
Cerro Porteño
Paraguayan Primera División: 2020 Apertura

References

External links

Josué Colmán profile at FIFA
Josué Colmán at ABC Paraguay 

1998 births
Living people
Sportspeople from Asunción
Paraguayan footballers
Paraguay international footballers
Paraguay under-20 international footballers
Association football midfielders
Designated Players (MLS)
Expatriate soccer players in the United States
Orlando City SC players
Major League Soccer players
Paraguayan expatriate footballers
Paraguayan expatriate sportspeople in the United States
Cerro Porteño players